The Inaru is a right tributary of the river Crișul Pietros in Romania. It flows into the Crișul Pietros in Săud.

References

Rivers of Romania
Rivers of Bihor County